This is a list of notable Chinese Americans, including both original immigrants who obtained American citizenship and their American descendants who have made exceptional contributions to various facets of American society.

To be included in this list, the person must have a Wikipedia article showing they are Chinese American or must have references showing they are Chinese American and are notable.

Arts

Dance
 Goh Choo San (吴诸珊) – ballet dancer and choreographer
 Shen Wei (沈伟) – dancer, choreographer and visual artist; MacArthur fellow
 Fang-Yi Sheu (許芳宜) – principal dancer of the Martha Graham Dance Company

Fashion design
 Malan Breton (马兰·布莱顿) – fashion designer
 Luly Yang – fashion designer
 Angel Chang – fashion designer
 Monika Chiang – fashion designer
 Wenlan Chia (賈雯蘭) – fashion designer
 Doug Chiang (江道格) – movie designer and artist
 David Chu (朱欽騏) – co-founder of clothing company Nautica
 Diana Eng – fashion designer
 Joe Allen Hong – fashion designer for Neiman Marcus
 Jen Kao – fashion designer
 Jonathan Koon – fashion designer, business entrepreneur
 Derek Lam – fashion designer
 Phillip Lim – fashion designer
 Peter Mui – fashion designer, actor, and musician
 Mary Ping – fashion designer
 Peter Som  – fashion designer
 Anna Sui (蕭志美) – fashion designer
 Vivienne Tam (谭燕玉) – fashion designer
 Yeohlee Teng – fashion designer
 Alexander Wang (王大仁) – fashion designer
 Kaisik Wong – fashion designer
 Vera Wang (王薇薇) – fashion designer
 Jason Wu (吳季剛) – fashion designer
 Joe Zee – creative director of Elle magazine; host of fashion TV series All on the Line

Literature
Bette Bao Lord (包柏漪) – writer, novelist
 Eileen Chang (张爱玲, a.k.a. 张煐) – writer
 Kang-i Sun Chang (孫康宜) – writer and literary scholar
 Lan Samantha Chang – writer; director of the Iowa Writer's Workshop
 Victoria Chang – poet, children's writer, and essayist
 Ted Chiang (姜峯楠) – speculative fiction writer
 Frank Chin (趙健秀) – novelist, playwright, and essayist
 Marilyn Chin (陈美玲) – poet
 Ben Fee (张恨棠/木云) – writer and labor organizer
 David Henry Hwang (黃哲倫) – playwright
 Gish Jen (任璧蓮) – writer, novelist
 Ha Jin (哈金) – novelist, winner of the National Book Award for Waiting
 Maxine Hong Kingston – novelist, The Woman Warrior
 R. F. Kuang (匡灵秀) – fantasy novelist, The Poppy War
 Jean Kwok – writer, novelist
 Edward Michael Law-Yone – writer, journalist; father of Wendy Law-Yone
 Wendy Law-Yone – writer
 Gus Lee (李健孫) – writer
 Carolyn Lei-Lanilau – writer
 Yiyun Li (李翊雲) – winner of the 2006 PEN/Hemingway Award
 Ed Lin (林景南) – writer, first author to win three Asian American Literary Awards
 Tao Lin (林韜) – writer
 Eric Liu (劉柏川) – author and speechwriter for former US President Bill Clinton
 Malinda Lo – writer, young adult novels, Ash
 David Wong Louie (雷祖威) – writer
 Marie Lu (陸希未) – writer
 Ling Ma – writer, Severance
 Adeline Yen Mah (馬嚴君玲) – author and physician
 William Marr (馬為義,非馬) – engineer, poet, translator, and artist
 Chanel Miller – artist and author of Know My Name
 Anchee Min (閔安琪) – author, Red Azalea
 Celeste Ng (伍綺詩) – writer, novelist
 Lisa See – writer
 Sui Sin Far (水仙花) – late 19th/early 20th century Chinese-English American author and journalist
 Amy Tan (譚恩美) – best-selling author, The Joy Luck Club
 Timothy Tau (謝韜) – writer, novelist, screenwriter, film director
 Jade Snow Wong (黃玉雪) – writer
 Shawn Wong – novelist, Homebase, American Knees; writer; professor
 Timothy C. Wong (黃宗泰) – sinologist, translator, and literary theorist
 Xu Xi (許素細) – English language novelist based in Hong Kong
Geling Yan (严歌苓) – novelist and screenwriter
 Gene Luen Yang (楊謹倫) – graphic novelist, whose book American Born Chinese was the first graphic novel to be nominated for a National Book Award
 Laurence Yep (叶祥添) – two-time winner of the Newbery Honor
 Connie Young Yu – writer, historian, lecturer, and 2016 "Woman of the Year" California Senate District 13
 Judy Yung – writer
 Kat Zhang – author of young adult and middle grade novels
 Jenny Zhang – essayist, poet, novelist
 Jenny Tinghui Zhang – novelist

Theater
 Ping Chong (張家平) – contemporary theater director
 Dan Kwong – playwright
 BD Wong – Tony Award-winning actor, M Butterfly, Law & Order: Special Victims Unit

Visual arts
Ernie Chan – comic book artist/inker for Marvel Comics and DC Comics.
Ching Ho Cheng – artist
 Alan Chin – artist
 Mel Chin – artist
 Cai Guo-Qiang (蔡國強) – artist and gunpowder works designer
 Han Hsiang-ning (韓湘寧) – artist
 James Wong Howe (黃宗霑) – nominated for ten Academy Awards for cinematography, won twice (1955, 1963)
 Maya Lin (林瓔) – architect (Vietnam Veterans Memorial)
 Reagan Louie – American photographer
 Seong Moy – painter and printmaker
 I. M. Pei (貝聿銘) – architect, designed the Louvre Pyramid
 Mimi So – jewelry designer
 May Sun – artist, public art
 Fan Tchunpi – painter, ceramicist
 Frank Wong – dioramist
 Tyrus Wong (黃齊耀) – artist
 Frank Wu – science-fiction illustrator
Xu Bing – artist

Business

Financial
 Gerald Chan – billionaire, son of T.H. Chan
 Tim Chen – co-founder and CEO of NerdWallet
 Yan Huo – co-founder of Capula Investment Management, 8th largest hedge fund in Europe by assets
 Alfred Lin (林君叡) – venture capitalist at Sequoia Capital
 Ken Lin – founder and CEO of Credit Karma
 Norman Liu – CEO and president of GECAS (2008–2015)
 Look Tin Eli (陸潤卿) – co-founder of the Canton Bank of San Francisco (1907-1926) and one of the prime movers in the rebuilding of Chinatown after the 1906 quake
 Li Lu – hedge fund manager and founder and chairman of Himalaya Capital Management
 Lou Pai – CEO of Enron Xcelerator, a venture capital division of Enron
 Donald Tang – former vice-chairman of Bear Stearns
 Oscar Tang (唐騮千) – financier and philanthropist
 Gerald Tsai – financier, former chairman and CEO of Primerica
 Mun Charn Wong – former executive of Transamerica Corporation 
 Peng Zhao – CEO of Citadel Securities

Food
 Roger H. Chen (陳河源) – founder of Tawa Supermarket Inc., also known as 99 Ranch Market
 Andrew Cherng (程正昌) – co-founder of Panda Express, billionaire
 Bob Chinn – owner of Bob Chinn's Crab House, highest grossing restaurant in America
 Johnny Kan – founder of Kan's Restaurant
 Ping Tom (譚繼平) – Chicago-based food industry businessman; uncle of Lauren Tom

Industrial
 Albert Chao – co-founder of Westlake Chemical
 Allen Chao – founder of Allergan, plc pharmaceutical and medical device co.
 David T. Hon – founder and CEO of Dahon bicycle co.
 Noel Lee – founder and CEO of Monster Cable
 Cyrus Tang – scrap metal and furniture magnate

Internet
 Fred Chang – founder of Newegg, billionaire
 Pehong Chen – founder of Gain Technology and Broadvision
 Perry Chen – co-founder of Kickstarter
 Steve Chen – co-founder of YouTube
 Ben Chiu – founder of KillerApp.com
 Tracy Chou – Project Include, former Pinterest and Quora engineer
 Daniel Ha – co-founder of Disqus
 Tony Hsieh (謝家華) – CEO of Zappos.com, online shoe store
 Jameson Hsu – co-founder and CEO of Mochi Media
 Justin Kan – co-founder Twitch
 Kai-Fu Lee – founding president of Google China
Ellen Pao: Reddit's CEO from 2014 to 2015, filed gender and race discrimination lawsuit against Perkins and lost
 Ben Silbermann – co-founder and CEO of Pinterest, billionaire
 Greg Tseng – co-founder and CEO of Tagged
 Yishan Wong – CEO of Reddit (2012–2014); director of engineering of Facebook (2005–2010)
 Jerry Yang – co-founder of NASDAQ-100 component Yahoo!, billionaire
 David Yu – high tech investor and CEO of Betfair (2006–2011)

Technology
 John S. Chen – CEO of BlackBerry; former CEO of Sybase
 Steve Chen – founder and CEO of Galactic Computing
 James Chu – founder, CEO and chairman of ViewSonic, one of the largest computer monitor brands
 Alfred Chuang – co-founder BEA Systems (acquired by Oracle for $8.5 billion in 2008)
 Weili Dai – co-founder of Marvell Technology Group
 Ping Fu (傅苹) – co-founder of Geomagic
 Ming Hsieh (謝明) – co-founder Cogent Systems (sold to 3M in 2009 for $930 million)
 Kai Huang – co-founder of Guitar Hero franchise
 Jensen Huang – co-founder and CEO of NASDAQ-100 component NVIDIA
 Robert T. Huang – founder of Fortune 500 company Synnex
 Min Kao (高民環) – co-founder of Garmin, billionaire
 David Lam – founder of NASDAQ-100 component Lam Research
 Patrick Soon-Shiong – founder of Abraxis BioScience and NantHealth, billionaire
 Lisa Su (蘇姿豐) – CEO and president of NASDAQ-100 component Advanced Micro Devices
 David Sun – co-founder and COO of Kingston Technologies, billionaire
 Sehat Sutardja – co-founder of Marvell Technology Group
 Lip-Bu Tan – president and CEO of Cadence Design Systems
 Victor Tsao – co-founder of Linksys (sold to Cisco Systems for $500 million)
 John Tu – co-founder of Kingston Technologies, billionaire
 An Wang (王安) – co-founder of Wang Laboratories (sold in 1999 for $1.5 billion)
 Charles Wang (王嘉廉) – founder of CA Technologies, owner of the New York Islanders
 William Wang – founder and CEO of Vizio
 Ken Xie – founder of Fortinet and NetScreen (acquired by Juniper Networks in 2004 for $4 billion)
 Bing Yeh – founder of Silicon Storage Technology and Greenliant Systems
 Eric Yuan, founder and CEO of Zoom
 Min Zhu – co-founder of WebEx (sold to Cisco Systems for $3.2 billion)

Other
 Sam Chang – New York real estate and hotel developer
 James S.C. Chao – New York shipping magnate and father of Elaine Chao
 John Chuang – co-founder and CEO of staffing consultancy Aquent
 Lew Hing – shipping, hotel, and canning tycoon
 Andrea Jung (鍾彬嫻) – Chair of Avon

Entertainment
Stephen Chao – media executive
 Dan Lin – Hollywood film producer and former SVP at Warner Bros.
 Mynette Louie – producer and co-founder of Gamechanger Films
 John J. Sie – founder of Starz Inc.
 Andrea Wong – president of International Production for Sony Pictures Television and president of International for Sony Pictures Entertainment

Actors
 Awkwafina (林家珍) – actress and rapper
 Tyson Beckford – model and actor
 Ross Butler - actor
 Chloe Bennet (汪可盈) – actress and singer
 T. V. Carpio – actress and singer
 Tina Huang — stage, television actress
 Tia Carrere – actress, singer
 Flora Chan (陳慧珊) – actress
 JuJu Chan – actress
 Michael Paul Chan - actor
 Emily Chang - actress
 Louis Ozawa Changchien – actor
 Rosalind Chao – actress
 Zoë Chao – actress and writer
 Fala Chen – actress
 Hank Chen – actor and comedian
 Joan Chen (陳冲) – actress, The Last Emperor, director
 Lynn Chen – actress, Saving Face
 Kevin Cheng (鄭嘉穎) – actor and singer
 Cheng Pei-pei (鄭佩佩) – actress, known for films Come Drink with Me and Crouching Tiger, Hidden Dragon
 Karin Anna Cheung – actress, Angela, in Quentin Lee's feature film The People I've Slept With (2009)
 Feodor Chin – actor, writer, director
 Lori Tan Chinn – actress
 Annabel Chong – adult film actress
 Peter Chong – film and stage actor
 China Chow – actress, model
 Kelsey Chow – actress
 Michaela Conlin – actress
 Auliʻi Cravalho – actress and singer
 Tiffany Espensen - actress
 Roger Fan – actor
 James Hong – actor and director
 George Hu (胡宇威) – actor
 Kelly Hu – actress
 Madison Hu – actress, Bizaardvark
 Celina Jade – actress, singer and martial artist
 Malese Jow – actress and singer on Unfabulous and The Vampire Diaries
 Archie Kao – actor and model
 Lawrence Kao - actor
 Matthew Yang King - actor
 Michelle Krusiec – actress
 Nancy Kwan – first Chinese-born star in Western cinema
 Brandon Lee (李國豪) – actor, son of Bruce Lee
 Bruce Lee (李小龍) – kung fu actor, son of Lee Hoi-chuen
 Jason Scott Lee – actor
 Michelle Lee – actress, martial artist and stuntwoman
 Peyton Elizabeth Lee - actress
 Shannon Lee (李香凝) – actress, and daughter of Bruce Lee
 Kaylani Lei – pornographic actress
 Al Leong - actor and stuntman
 Ken Leung – actor, Lost, X-Men: The Last Stand
 Telly Leung - actor and singer
 James Hiroyuki Liao – actor
 Julia Ling (林小微) – actress, Chuck
 Dyana Liu – actress
 Lucy Liu (刘玉玲) – actress, Charlie's Angels, Kill Bill
 Liu Yifei – actress and singer
 John Lone – actor, most notable for his role as Pu Yi in The Last Emperor
 Jodi Long – actress
 Keye Luke – actor
 Tzi Ma (馬泰) – actor
 Byron Mann – actor, notable for playing the role of Ryu in Street Fighter
 Marie Matiko – actress
 Meiling Melançon – actress
 Matthew Moy – actor, 2 Broke Girls, most notable for the voice of Lars Barriga (Steven Universe)
 Olivia Munn – actress, model and television personality
 Irene Ng – actress, played the title character in Nickelodeon's The Mystery Files of Shelby Woo
 Melissa Ng – actress
 Haing S. Ngor – actor; won an Oscar for Best Supporting Actor in The Killing Fields 
 Julia Nickson-Soul – actress, most notable for playing the role of Co-Bao in Rambo: First Blood Part II
 Jimmy Ouyang (歐陽萬成) – actor, writer and comedian
 Will Pan (潘瑋柏) – singer and songwriter
 Janel Parrish – actress and singer
 Ke Huy Quan – actor and stunt choreographer; played Short Round in Indiana Jones and the Temple of Doom
 Chester See – YouTube personality, musician, and Broadway actor.
 Ivan Shaw – actor
 Freda Foh Shen - actress
 Parry Shen – actor
 Robin Shou (仇雲波) – actor, stuntman, martial artist
 Harry Shum, Jr. (岑勇康) – actor, dancer, and singer in Glee and Shadowhunters
 Soo Yong (岑勇) – Hollywood and television actress.
 Kaiji Tang (唐凯吉) – voice actor
 Will Tiao (刁毓能) – actor and producer
 Jennifer Tilly – actress, Bound (born in California)
 Meg Tilly – actress
 Chuti Tiu – actress, Desire, 24, Dragnet, Beautiful, The Specials; former America's Junior Miss (first non-Caucasian winner)
 Kiana Tom – actress, television host, and exercise instructor
 Lauren Tom – actress, The Joy Luck Club, "Julie" on Friends
 Jessika Van – actress, singer, portrays "Becca" on MTV's Awkward
 Garrett Wang – actor in Star Trek: Voyager
 Ming-Na Wen (溫明娜) – Macanese-born actress, ER, Mulan
 Anna May Wong (黃柳霜) – first female Asian-American star of the screen
 Grace Wong (王君馨) – actress
 Michael Wong (王敏德) – actor
 Russell Wong (王盛德) – actor
 Victor Wong (黃自強) – actor
 Constance Wu (吳恬敏) – actress
 Daniel Wu – actor
 Jade Wu – actress, screenwriter, director
 Kevin Wu (吳凱文) – YouTube star, once #1 all-time most subscribed comedian
 Leonard Wu – actor, producer and writer
 Bowen Yang – actor and writer, Saturday Night Live
 Welly Yang – actor and artist
 Michelle Ye (葉璇) – actress
 Kelvin Han Yee – actor
 Gwendoline Yeo – musician and actress
 Keone Young – actor
 Eugenia Yuan (原麗淇) – actress and daughter of Cheng Pei-pei
 Catalina Yue – actress, singer, model
 Victor Sen Yung – actor, portrayed Hop Sing in Bonanza
 Nan Zhang (张楠) – actress, Gossip Girl

Directors
 Arvin Chen – director and screenwriter
 Tze Chun – writer, director
 Esther Eng – director
Dayyan Eng - writer, producer, director
 Ang Lee – Academy Award-winning director
 Quentin Lee (李孟熙) – Canadian / American director, known for gay Asian stories
 Justin Lin – director, Better Luck Tomorrow, The Fast and the Furious: Tokyo Drift, Fast & Furious
 Freida Lee Mock – Academy Award-winning documentary filmmaker and co-founder of the American Film Foundation
 David Ren – film director, Shanghai Kiss
 Timothy Tau – writer and director
 Wayne Wang – Hollywood director; won the Golden Shell
 Ruby Yang – film director
 Jessica Yu – Academy Award-winning documentary filmmaker; film and television director

Musicians
 Jin Au-yeung – rapper, songwriter, actor
 Carmit Bachar – singer and member of the Pussycat Dolls
 Baiyu – singer, songwriter, actress, mtvU VJ
 Jaycee Chan – Hong Kong singer-songwriter, actor
 Robert Chen – violinist, concertmaster of Chicago Symphony Orchestra
 Chi Cheng – bassist of alternative metal band, Deftones
 Andrew Chou – member of hip-hop group Machi
 Dawen – singer, songwriter
 Leah Dizon – model and singer
 Khalil Fong – singer, songwriter
 Nichkhun Buck Horvejkul – singer and rapper member of the K-pop group, 2PM
 Hao Huang (pianist), composer, writer and professor at Scripps College
 Lucia Hwong – composer, musician, known for ethereal music and pipa (Chinese lute)
 Jon Jang – jazz pianist, composer, band leader
 Kelis – singer 1/4 Chinese
Fei Xiang (费翔) – a.k.a. Kris Phillips, pop singer and theater actor 
 Larissa Lam – singer-songwriter, television host, music executive, film director
 Chihchun Chi-sun Lee – composer
 CoCo Lee – singer
 Dai-Keong Lee – composer
 Cho-Liang Lin – violinist
 Jenny Lin – pianist
 Joseph Lin – first violinist for Juilliard String Quartet
 Amber Liu – rapper and singer of K-pop group f(x)
 Kate Liu – classical pianist
 Justin Lo – Hong Kong singer-songwriter, actor
 Zhou Long – winner of the 2011 Pulitzer Prize for Music
 Yo-Yo Ma (馬友友) – cellist
 Charles Mingus – jazz double bassist, composer, band leader
 Chino Moreno – vocalist and guitarist of Deftones
 Fats Navarro – jazz trumpeter
 Ne-Yo – R&B artist, 1/4 Chinese
 Richard On – guitarist-songwriter for rock band O.A.R.
 Will Pan – singer-songwriter, rapper and actor
 Saweetie – rapper
 Bright Sheng – composer, conductor, and pianist
 Shunza – singer
 Vienna Teng – singer-songwriter
 Kenneth Tse – classical saxophonist
 Sam Tsui – YouTube singer
 Mark Tuan – Taiwanese rapper of K-pop group Got7
 Lara Veronin – vocalist
 Wang Leehom – singer-songwriter, record producer, actor and film director
 Joanna Wang – singer
 Chris Wong Won ("Fresh Kid Ice", 'The Chinaman") – Chinese Trinidadian rapper, member of 2 Live Crew
 Only Won – rapper, actor, martial artist, producer of Finding Cleveland
 Vanness Wu – actor, singer, director, producer
 Sophia Yan – classical pianist
 Catalina Yue – singer, songwriter, model
 Nancy Zhou – violin player

Other
 Chang and Eng Bunker (暹羅雙胞胎) – Siamese twins, pioneer immigrants
 Ken Hom – chef, author and British television show presenter
 Steven Ho – martial artist and stunt man
 Janet Hsieh – model and travel host of Fun Taiwan
 Eddie Huang (黃頤銘) – writer, celebrity TV chef
 William Hung – musician of American Idol fame
 Carrie Ann Inaba – judge on Dancing with the Stars
 Rupert Jee – owner of the Hello Deli next to the Ed Sullivan Theater; regular on Late Show with David Letterman
 Miranda Kwok – screenwriter
 Shin Lim (林申) – close-up magician
 Afong Moy – "The Chinese Lady," pioneer immigrant
 May Pang (庞凤仪) – personal assistant and arts producer for John Lennon and Yoko Ono, romantic partner with Lennon.
 Ming Tsai – chef and restaurateur (Blue Ginger); host of Emmy Award-winning television show East Meets West
 Shen Wei – choreographer, stage designer
 Kristina Wong (黄君儀) – comedian
 Martin Yan – chef, host of Yan Can Cook
 Janet Yang (杨燕子) - film producer
 Vern Yip – interior designer and TV host

Journalism and news media
 Ben Calhoun – radio journalist with This American Life
 Melissa Chan – journalist with ABC News (2002-2004) and Al Jazeera America (2013-2016)
 Sewell Chan – journalist, The New York Times
 Emily Chang – journalist from CNN
 Iris Chang (張純如) – historian and journalist, Thread of the Silkworm and The Rape of Nanking
 Jeff Chang – journalist, hip-hop historian
 Laura Chang – science editor, The New York Times
 Adrian Chen – investigative journalist, staff writer at The New Yorker
 Christine Chen – journalist and anchor
 Julie Chen – newsreader on The Early Show and host of Big Brother
 Anna Chen Chennault (陳香梅) – journalist, spouse of Claire Chennault, of the Flying Tigers
 Ron Chew – former editor International Examiner, founding member of Seattle Chapter of the Asian American Journalists Association
 Howard G. Chua-Eoan – news director, Time magazine
 Connie Chung – became the second woman to co-anchor a major network national news broadcast
 Veronica De La Cruz – journalist, NBC News (2010–2014); alternating anchor on both Early Today on NBC and First Look on MSNBC
 Ben Fong-Torres (方振豪) – journalist, Rolling Stone
 Cindy Hsu – news reporter at WCBS-TV in New York City
 Weijia Jiang (姜偉嘉) - White House correspondent, CBS News
 Jennifer 8. Lee (李競) – journalist, The New York Times
 Melissa Lee – Emmy award-winning journalist, CNBC, NBC News, MSNBC, Bloomberg Television, CNN Financial News
 Portia Li (李秀蘭) – journalist
Dion Lim – Emmy Award winning journalist 
 Carol Lin – news anchor
 Sam Chu Lin (趙帝恩) – journalist, one of the first Asian Americans on network TV news
 Laura Ling – journalist, sister of Lisa Ling
 Lisa Ling (凌志慧) (1973- ) – journalist, known for her role as a co-host of ABC's The View and host of National Geographic Ultimate Explorer
 Betty Liu – news anchor, Bloomberg Television
 Richard Lui – news anchor of MSNBC
 Chiang Nan (江南) – newspaper editor
 Kaity Tong – news anchor for WPIX-TV in New York City
 Edward Wong – journalist, former writer for The New York Times
 Sheryl WuDunn – Pulitzer Prize–winning journalist and author
 Jeff Yang – columnist for The Wall Street Journal
 John Yang – Peabody Award winning news correspondent and commentator for NBC Nightly News with Brian Williams, Today, and MSNBC
 Angela Yee - radio personality at Power 105.1FM
 Anthony Yuen (阮次山) – journalist

Military
 Danny Chen (陳宇暉) – Private, United States Army Infantryman, was found shot to death after being racially harassed and beaten by his fellow soldiers in Afghanistan
 Arthur Chin (陳瑞鈿) – World War II pilot and fighter ace with Canton Provincial Air Force, National Revolutionary Army
 Larry Wu-tai Chin (金无怠) – CIA and Army translator and intelligence analyst 1944–1981, spy for China. 
 David S. C. Chu – United States Army Captain (retired), Under Secretary of Defense for Personnel and Readiness (2001–2008), president/CEO of the Institute for Defense Analyses
 Gordon Pai'ea Chung-Hoon – United States Navy Rear Admiral (Upper Half)
 John Liu Fugh – first Chinese American officer to be promoted to the rank of major general in the United States Army; first Chinese American to serve as Judge Advocate General of the Army
 Wah Kau Kong – United States Air Force Second Lieutenant, first Chinese American fighter pilot
 Hazel Ying Lee (李月英) – first Chinese American woman to earn a pilot's license; flew for the United States Army Air Forces during World War II as a Woman Airforce Service Pilot (WASP)
 Kurt Lee – Major, US Marine Corps.; first Asian American Marine Corps officer, Navy Cross recipient
 Coral Wong Pietsch – United States Army Reserve Brigadier General, first female Asian American general officer
 Suzanne Vares-Lum (born 1967 - United States Army Major-General, served in Iraq War
 Francis B. Wai – United States Army Captain, only Chinese American to have been awarded the Medal of Honor
 Mun Charn Wong – United States Air Force Lieutenant Colonel, friend of Wah Kau Kong
 Ted Wong – United States Army Major General, Chief of the U.S. Army Dental Corps (2011–2014)
 Xiong Yan – student leader during the Tiananmen Square protests of 1989 and now a chaplain in the United States Army
 James Yee – United States Army Captain and chaplain, formerly charged with sedition; author of the memoir For God and Country: Faith and Patriotism Under Fire
 Jonathan A. Yuen – United States Navy Rear Admiral and commander of Naval Supply Systems Command
 Fang Wong – National Commander of The American Legion (2011–2012)

Politics and government

National politics
 Elaine Chao (赵小兰) – former Secretary of Transportation (2017-2021) and former Secretary of Labor (2001–2009) (Republican)
 Lanhee Chen (陳仁宜) – conservative government policy academic, policy director in Mitt Romney's 2012 presidential campaign (Republican), news media political commentator
 Steven Chu (朱棣文) – physicist, former Secretary of Energy (2009–2013), winner of 1997 Nobel Prize in Physics for research in laser cooling (Democratic)
 Nancy-Ann DeParle – Director of the White House Office of Health Reform (Democratic)
 Gary Locke (骆家辉) – United States Ambassador to China (2011–2014); United States Secretary of Commerce (2009–2011); Governor of Washington (1997–2005), first and only Chinese American to serve as a state governor (Democratic)
 Chris Lu (卢沛宁) – Assistant to former President Barack Obama and Cabinet Secretary (Democratic)
 Tina Tchen (陈远美) – Chief of Staff to the First Lady of the United States, director of Office of Public Liaison during Obama administration (Democratic)
 Andrew Yang (杨安泽) – 2020 presidential candidate

Congress
 Daniel Akaka – former US Senator from Hawaii; first Native Hawaiian US Senator; Democrat
 Judy Chu (趙美心) – first Chinese-American woman to serve as US Representative (2009–present); Democrat
 Charles Djou (周永康) – US Representative from Hawaii (2010–2011); Republican
 Hiram L. Fong (鄺友良) – former US Senator from Hawaii; first US Senator of Chinese ancestry; Republican
 Ted Lieu (劉雲平) – Democrat representing the 33rd District of California
 Grace Meng (孟昭文) – Democrat representing the 22nd District of New York
 David Wu (吳振偉) – first Taiwanese American US Representative, Democrat from Oregon

Local and state
 Wilma Chan – first Asian American California State Assembly Majority Leader (2002–2004); Democrat
 John Chiang – California State Controller (2007–present); Democrat
 Margaret Chin – member of the New York City Council representing Chinatown
 David Chiu – Democrat representing the 17th Assembly District, California State Assembly
 March Fong Eu – former Secretary of State of California (1975–1994), elected in 1974, she won reelection four times; United States Ambassador to the Federated States of Micronesia (1994–1996); Democrat
 Matthew K. Fong – California State Treasurer (1995–1999), adoptive son of March Fong Eu; Republican
 Allan Fung – Mayor of Cranston, Rhode Island; Republican
 Tony Hwang – State Representative of the Connecticut General Assembly; Republican
 Ed Jew – former member of the San Francisco Board of Supervisors; Democrat
 Peter Koo – member of the New York City Council representing Flushing, Queens
 Ed Lee – Mayor of San Francisco (2011–2017)
 Harry Lee – longtime sheriff of Jefferson Parish, Louisiana; first elected in 1979, he was re-elected six times and served 27 and a half years (Democratic)
 Susan C. Lee – Senator, Maryland Senate of Maryland General Assembly;first Asian American elected to Maryland Senate and first Chinese American elected to Maryland House of Delegates and Maryland General Assembly.
 John Liu – New York City Comptroller (2010–2013)
 Alex Wan – member of the Atlanta City Council, first openly gay and first Asian American member
 Shien Biau Woo (吳仙標) – Lieutenant Governor of Delaware (1985–1989), current president of the 80-20 Initiative; Democrat
 Michelle Wu (吳弭) – elected Mayor of Boston
 Leland Yee (余胤良) – former California State Assemblyman, current California State Senator
 Yiaway Yeh – mayor of Palo Alto, California; first Chinese American to hold the office
 Mae Yih – Oregon State Representative (1977–1983), Oregon State Senator (1983–2003), first Chinese American to serve in a state senate; Democrat

Law and judiciary
 Norman Bay – former United States Attorney for the District of New Mexico (2000–2001); first Chinese American United States Attorney
 Denny Chin – judge of the United States District Court for the Southern District of New York (1994–present), first Asian American appointed as a United States district court judge outside of the Ninth Circuit
 Ming Chin – Associate Justice, Supreme Court of California
 Morgan Chu (朱欽文) – Partner, Chair of Litigation, former Co-Managing Partner of Irell & Manella; former president (2014–15) and board member (2009–15) of Harvard Board of Overseers
 Amy Chua – professor of law; author of Battle Hymn of the Tiger Mother
 Mary Anne Franks – professor of law, author of The Cult of the Constitution, president of Cyber Civil Rights Initiative
 Dolly M. Gee – federal district judge, United States District Court for the Central District of California
 Joyce Kennard – Associate Justice, Supreme Court of California
 George H. King – federal district judge, United States District Court for the Central District of California
 William F. Lee – co-managing partner of WilmerHale and fellow of the Harvard Corporation
 Ronald Lew – federal district judge, United States District Court for the Central District of California; first Chinese-American federal judge outside of Hawaii
 Goodwin Liu – Associate Justice of the Supreme Court of California
 Brian Sun – trial lawyer
 Thomas Tang – judge of the United States Court of Appeals for the Ninth Circuit; first Chinese American federal judge
 Jan C. Ting (丁景安) – professor of law; expert on immigration, national security, and taxation; 2006 Republican candidate for Senate (DE)
 Qian Julie Wang (王乾) – Lawyer and memoirist
 Delbert Wong – judge

Community and civil rights
 Grace Lee Boggs (陳玉平) – community activist in African-American community; leftist writer
 Chin Lin Sou – community leader
 Hung Wai Ching – community leader and businessman
 Goo Kim Fui (古今辉) – President, United Chinese Society in Hawaii, 1892–1898; played an instrumental role in uniting the Chinese and fighting for their rights during the anti-Chinese agitation in Hawaii in the 1880s
 Charles Goodall Lee – first licensed Chinese American dentist in the United States, financier of Chinese American Citizens Alliance in Oakland Chinatown, spouse of Clara Elizabeth Chan Lee
 Clara Elizabeth Chan Lee – first Chinese American woman voter in the United States
 Mabel Ping-Hua Lee – Chinese advocate for women's suffrage in the United States, community organizer in New York City's Chinatown, and leader of the First Chinese Baptist Church in Chinatown.
 Wong Chin Foo (王清福) – 19th-century civil rights activist and journalist
 Wong Kim Ark (黃金德) – his lawsuit established the principle of citizenship by virtue of birth on US soil
 Harry Wu (吴弘达) – human rights activist, focuses on Laogai prison camps and human rights in China
 Sherman Wu – civil rights activist, famous racial discrimination incident by university fraternity
 Xiao Qiang (萧强) – MacArthur Fellowship for human rights activism, publisher of China Digital Times covering rights and censorship in China, journalism professor
 John C. Young (容兆珍) – San Francisco Chinatown leader
 Helen Zia (謝漢蘭) – community activist and writer

Science and academia

Nobel Prize
Chen Ning Yang (楊振寧) – 1957 Nobel laureate, Physics, Yang–Mills theory
Tsung-dao Lee (李政道) – 1957 Nobel laureate, Physics
 Samuel C. C. Ting (丁肇中) – 1976 Nobel laureate, Physics
 Yuan T. Lee (李远哲) – 1986 Nobel Prize, Chemistry
 Steven Chu (朱棣文) – 1997 Nobel Prize in Physics, US Secretary of Energy (2009)
 Daniel Chee Tsui (崔琦) – 1998 Nobel laureate, Physics
 Roger Y. Tsien (錢永健) – 2008 Nobel laureate, chemistry
 Charles K. Kao (高锟) – 2009 Nobel laureate in Physics who pioneered the development and use of fiber optics in telecommunications

Mathematics award winners
 Terence Chi-Shen Tao (陶哲軒) – Fields Medal (2006), Clay Research Award (2003), Crafoord Prize (2012)
 Shing-Tung Yau (丘成桐) – Fields Medal (1982), Wolf Prize (2010), Crafoord Prize (1994)
 Andrew Yao (姚期智) – Turing Award (2000)
 Shiing-Shen Chern (陳省身) – Wolf Prize (1983)
 Wei Zhang (张伟) – Clay Research Award (2019)
 Xinyi Yuan (袁新意) – Clay Research Award (2008)

Chemistry
 Ching W. Tang – inventor of the organic light-emitting diode(OLED) and the hetero-junction organic photovoltaic cell (OPV); winner of the 2011 Wolf Prize in Chemistry; known as the "father of organic electronics"
Roger Y. Tsien (錢永健) – 2008 Nobel laureate, chemistry
 Peidong Yang – chemist; founding member of the scientific advisory board at Nanosys, a nanomaterials company; co-founder of Alphabet Energy
 Xiaowei Zhuang – Professor of Chemistry and Chemical Biology and of Physics at Harvard University, member of National Academy of Sciences, MacArthur Fellow (2003)
Zhijian Chen (陈志坚) - Professor in the Department of Molecular Biology at University of Texas Southwestern Medical Center. He is best known for his discovery of mechanisms by which nucleic acids trigger innate and autoimmune responses from the interior of a cell, work for which he received the 2019 Breakthrough Prize in Life Sciences.
Xiaoliang Sunney Xie (谢晓亮) - biochemist, considered a founding father of single-molecule biophysical chemistry and single-molecule enzymology

Computer science
 Danqi Chen (陈丹琦) – AI professor at Princeton University working in Natural language processing, PhD from Stanford University, former student of Andrew Yao
 Jianlin Cheng (程建林) – computer and data scientist; Associate Professor in the Computer Science Department at the University of Missouri, Columbia
 Wen Tsing Chow (周文俊) – missile guidance scientist, digital computer pioneer
 Leon Chua – professor in the Department of Electrical Engineering and Computer Sciences at the University of California, Berkeley
 Feng-hsiung Hsu (許峰雄) – IBM developer of Deep Blue, which beat World Chess Champion Garry Kasparov in 1997
 Fei-Fei Li (李飞飞) – AI researcher, Stanford University professor
 Kai Li – Princeton University
 Ming C. Lin – former Distinguished Professor of Computer Science at the University of North Carolina at Chapel Hill, now at U. Maryland.
 Andrew Ng (吴恩达) – AI researcher and entrepreneur: Google Brain, Baidu research, Coursera, Stanford University professor
 Carol E. Reiley: entrepreneur in health, robotics and AI, Andrew Ng's wife
 Pei-Yuan Wei (魏培源) – creator of ViolaWWW
 Wen-mei Hwu – professor at University of Illinois at Urbana–Champaign specializing in compiler design, computer architecture, computer microarchitecture, and parallel processing
 Andrew Yao (姚期智) – 2000 Turing Award recipient, Yao's principle, former professor at Princeton University
 Frances Yao (储枫) – computer scientist, researcher in computational geometry and combinatorial algorithms; wife of Andrew Yao
 Yuanyuan Zhou – Princeton University PhD, currently UC San Diego

Engineering
 Huajian Gao – Walter H. Annenberg Professor of Engineering at Brown University
 Tung Hua Lin (林同驊) – professor (UCLA), aerospace and structural engineer
 Tung-Yen Lin (林同棪) – (Berkeley) structural engineer who was the pioneer of standardizing the use of prestressed concrete, founded T. Y. Lin International
 Lee Yuk-Wing (李郁榮) – Professor of Electrical Engineering at Massachusetts Institute of Technology

Mathematics
 Terence Chi-Shen Tao (陶哲軒) – child genius, Fields Medal winner (2006), professor (UCLA), MacArthur Fellow (2006), Crafoord Prize (2012), Breakthrough Prize in Mathematics (2014). He is the youngest participant to date in the International Mathematical Olympiad, first competing at the age of ten; in 1986, 1987, and 1988, he won a bronze, silver, and gold medal. He remains the youngest winner of each of the three medals in the Olympiad's history, winning the gold medal shortly after his thirteenth birthday. Tao received graduated from university at the age of 16 obtaining his bachelor's and master's degrees, received his PhD at the age of 20.
Lenhard Ng – child prodigy who was once thought to be the "smartest kid in America". At age 10, he earned a perfect score of 800 on the math portion of what is now called the SAT, a feat considered to be a “remarkable achievement” when a high school junior or senior did it. Ng is a professor of mathematics at Duke University.
Jeffrey Yi-Lin Forrest (林益) – professor of mathematics, systems science, economics, and finance at Pennsylvania State System of Higher Education (Slippery Rock campus)
Wei Zhang (张伟) – Professor of Mathematics at the Massachusetts Institute of Technology
 Sun-Yung Alice Chang (张圣容) – professor of mathematics and former chair of the department at Princeton University
 Chen Wen-chen (陈文成) – professor of math at Carnegie Mellon, victim of Taiwan KMT persecution of dissidents (see White Terror)
 Shiing-Shen Chern (陳省身) – Wolf Prize, considered one of the greatest mathematicians of the 20th century; worked on differential geometry and topology; known for Chern-Simons theory, Chern-Weil theory, Chern classes
 Chia-Kun Chu (朱家琨) – applied mathematician, Fu Foundation Professor Emeritus of Applied Mathematics at Columbia University
 Chia-Chiao Lin (林家翹) – applied mathematician 
Tian Gang (田刚) – Princeton University professor emeritus, student of S.T. Yau
 Paul Tseng – applied mathematician, professor at the Department of Mathematics at the University of Washington in Seattle
 Paul C. Yang (杨建平) – Princeton University, husband of Alice Chang
 Shing-Tung Yau (丘成桐) – Fields Medal winner (1982); MacArthur Fellow (1984), Crafoord Prize (1994), National Medal of Science (1997), Wolf Prize (2010)
 Yitang Zhang – mathematician, known for establishing the first finite bound on gaps between prime numbers
Stephen Shing-Toung Yau – Distinguished Professor Emeritus at the University of Illinois at Chicago
Mu-Tao Wang (王慕道) – Professor of Mathematics at Columbia University, received a PhD in Mathematics in 1998 from Harvard University

Medicine and biosciences
 Priscilla Chan (陈Priscilla) – Harvard-graduated pediatrician, Chan-Zuckerberg foundation
 Min Chueh Chang (張明覺) – co-inventor of the first birth control pill; made significant contributions to the development of in vitro fertilisation
 Gilbert Chu (朱築文) – biochemist and Professor of Medicine (Oncology) and Biochemistry at the Stanford Medical School; older brother of Steven Chu
 Yuan-Cheng Fung (馮元楨) – founder of modern biomechanics
 Lue Gim Gong (呂金功) – horticulturalist
 David Ho – scientific researcher and the Irene Diamond professor at Rockefeller University in New York City
 Alice S. Huang – virologist
 Lin He – biochemist, received the MacArthur Fellowship in 2009
 Yuet Wai Kan – pioneer of using DNA to diagnose human diseases, research enabled the Human Genome Project, recipient of Lasker Foundation award in 1991
 Henry C. Lee – forensic scientist
 Sandra Lee – dermatologist and Internet celebrity as "Dr. Pimple Popper"; now star of the TLC series Dr. Pimple Popper
 Ching Chun Li – population geneticist and human geneticist
 Choh Hao Li (李卓皓) – biochemist, discovered growth hormone, beta-endorphin and isolated luteinizing hormone
 Min Chiu Li – first scientist to use chemotherapy to cure widely metastatic, malignant cancer
 Anna Chao Pai – geneticist
 Joe Hin Tjio – cytogeneticist, first person to recognize the normal number of human chromosomes
 Chang Yi Wang – immunologist; NYIPLA Inventor of the Year Award in 2007 for her work on UBITh peptide immunogens
 James C. Wang – discovered DNA topoisomerases
 Sam Wang, neuroscientist and author
 Shih-Chun Wang – neuroscientist and pharmacology professor
 Xiaodong Wang, biochemist best known for his work with cytochrome c, won the 2000 Eli Lilly Award in Biological Chemistry, and 2006 Shaw Prize recipient
 Leana Wen (温麟衍) – physician; director of Planned Parenthood, Health Commissioner of Baltimore, author
 David T. Wong – discovered drug Fluoxetine and atomoxetine, duloxetine and dapoxetine
 Flossie Wong-Staal – virologist and AIDS researcher
 Junying Yu – stem cell biologist; recognized as one of the 2007 "Persons of the Year" by TIME magazine
 Kang Zhang – ophthalmologist at the Institute for Genomic Medicine, University of California, San Diego known for his work on lanosterol

Physics
 Sow-Hsin Chen – nuclear physicist
 Alfred Y. Cho – the "father of molecular beam epitaxy" and co-inventor of quantum cascade lasers
 Paul C. W. Chu (朱經武) – physicist, superconductivity
 Qian Xuesen (钱学森) – professor of aeronautics, a founder of NASA Jet Propulsion Laboratory, exiled to China
 Frank Shu – professor of astronomy at the University of California, Berkeley and University of California; San Diego and 2009 Shaw Prize recipient
 Chien-Shiung Wu (吳健雄) – Manhattan Project scientist; considerable contribution to Nobel Prize work by Tsung-dao Lee
 Nai-Chang Yeh – physicist specialized in condensed matter physics; Fellow, American Association for the Advancement of Science; Fellow, American Physical Society
 Shoucheng Zhang – Stanford physicist
 Chen Ning Yang (楊振寧) – 1957 Nobel laureate, Physics, Yang–Mills theory
 Tsung-dao Lee (李政道) – 1957 Nobel laureate, Physics
 Samuel C. C. Ting (丁肇中) – 1976 Nobel laureate, Physics
 Steven Chu (朱棣文) – 1997 Nobel Prize in Physics, US Secretary of Energy (2009)
 Daniel Chee Tsui (崔琦) – 1998 Nobel laureate, Physics
 Charles K. Kao (高锟) – 2009 Nobel laureate in Physics who pioneered the development and use of fiber optics in telecommunications
 Xiaoxing Xi (郗小星) – Physicist at Temple University]

Economics, Finance, Statistics, OR 

Anthony Chan – chief economist, JPMorgan Chase; former economist at the Federal Reserve Bank of New York and economics professor at the University of Dayton
Gregory Chow (鄒至莊) – Class of 1913 Professor of Political Economy at Princeton University, known for Chow test
Jianqing Fan (范剑青) – professor of finance and statistics at Princeton University
William C. Hsiao (萧庆伦) – economist, professor at Harvard T.H. Chan School of Public Health
Ann Lee (李淯) – professor, author and commentator on global economics and finance issues
Bin Yu (郁彬) – Chancellor's Professor in the Departments of Statistics and of Electrical Engineering & Computer Sciences at University of California, Berkeley

Social sciences

 Angela Lee Duckworth – professor of Psychology at the University of Pennsylvania, MacArthur Fellow; wrote Grit: The Power of Passion and Perseverance
Peter Kwong – professor of Asian American studies at Hunter College and professor of sociology in the City University of New York system
Yu Xie – Bert G. Kerstetter '66 University Professor of Sociology at Princeton University; known for applying quantitative data science methods to sociology as well as Chinese studies

Humanities 
 Wing-tsit Chan (陳榮捷) – professor in Chinese philosophy, wrote influential translations
 Him Mark Lai (麥禮謙) – professor of Chinese American studies
 Lin Yutang (林語堂) – Hokkien Chinese writer
 Huping Ling (令狐萍) – professor of History at Truman State University, author
 Liu Kwang-ching (劉廣京) – Historian of late imperial China; University of California, Davis.
 Betty Lee Sung (宋李瑞芳) – former professor of Asian-American Studies at City College of New York; 'leading authority' on Chinese Americans
 Andrew Lih (酈安治) – associate professor of Journalism at American University
 Teng Ssu-yu (鄧嗣禹) – Historian of late imperial China, at University of Indiana.
 Tim Wu (吳修銘) – professor at Columbia Law School, in 2014 ran to become the first Chinese-American lieutenant governor of New York State but lost.
 C.K. Yang (楊慶堃) – Sociologist at University of Pittsburgh.
 Yang Lien-sheng (楊聯陞) – Sinologist. Harvard University.
 Yu Ying-shih (余英時) – Historian of China; Harvard, Yale, and Princeton Universities. 
 Zhao Yuanren (Yuen Ren Chao) (趙元任) – Linguist at Harvard and University of California, Berkeley.

University administration
 Jim Chen – professor and former dean at the University of Louisville Brandeis School of Law
 Stephen Z.D. Cheng – Professor and former Dean in the College of Polymer Science and Polymer Engineering at the University of Akron, member of National Academic of Engineering
 David Jung-Kuang Chiu – former Director of Asian Studies and Dean of University Advisement, Hofstra University
 Way Kuo – President and University Distinguished Professor of the City University of Hong Kong, University Distinguished Professor and former Dean of Engineering at the University of Tennessee
 Robert C. T. Lee (李崇道) – former president of National Chung Hsing University, veterinarian and brother of Tsung-dao Lee
 Chang-Lin Tien – Chancellor of University of California, Berkeley (1990–1997)
 Frank H. Wu – Chancellor and Dean of the University of California, Hastings College of the Law (2010–2015)
 Henry T. Yang – Chancellor of UC Santa Barbara

Earth Sciences
 Sherry Chen (陈霞芬) – Hydrologist working for National Weather Service

Sports
 Nathan Adrian (倪家骏) – Olympic medal winner, swimming
 Shayna Baszler – professional wrestler and mixed martial artist
 Johnny Chan (陳金海, 陳強尼) – professional poker player
 Michael Chang (張德培) – youngest male tennis player to win a Grand Slam tournament
 Ray Chang – baseball player
 Karen Chen (陳楷雯) – figure skater
 Nathan Chen (陳巍) – figure skater, 2022 Olympic gold medalist
 Tiffany Chin (陳婷婷) – figure skater and 1985 U.S. national champion
 Brian Ching (程拜仁) – soccer player for Houston Dynamo and the United States national team
 Mark Chung – first American-Chinese soccer player to play for the United States national team
 Patrick Chung – Strong Safety for the New England Patriots
 Amy Chow (周婉儀) – gymnast and Olympic medal winner
 Norm Chow (周友賢) – UCLA Bruins offensive coordinator
 Julie Chu (朱慧雯) – Olympic medal winner, ice hockey
 Mark Foo – professional surfer
 Christina Gao (高昊) – figure skater
 Chau Giang – poker player
 Eileen Gu (谷爱凌) – Free style skier and Olympic gold medalist
 Rudy Gunawan (郭宏源) – badminton player
 Tony Gunawan (吳俊明) – badminton player
 Ivana Hong – gymnastics
 Jerry Hsu – skateboarder
 Michelle Jin (米歇尔·金) - professional bodybuilder
 John Juanda – poker player
 Phillip King – tennis player, brother of Vania King
 Vania King – tennis player who won both the 2010 Wimbledon Women's Doubles and 2010 US Open Women's Doubles titles
 Karen Kwan – former figure skater, sister of Michelle Kwan
 Michelle Kwan (關穎珊) – Olympic medal winner, figure skating
 Alice Lee – chess player, FIDE Master
 Jeremy Lin (林書豪) – professional basketball player, NBA (NY Knicks, Toronto Raptors, etc.), Linsanity
 Corrie Lothrop – gymnastics
 Tyson Mao – speedcuber
 Kim Ng (伍佩琴) – Major League Baseball executive
 Karlee Perez – professional wrestler known as Catrina and the WWE as Maxine (Chinese ancestry)
 Chuck Sun – professional Motocross racer
 Kevin Tan (谭凯文) – Olympic medal winner, gymnastics
 Ed Wang – professional American football player
 Lisa Wang – rhythmic gymnastics
 Kevin Wong – professional beach volleyball player and Olympian
 Raymond Wu (吳紹綱) – professional poker player
 Don Yee – sports agent
 Al Young – World Champion drag racer
 Jennifer Yu (于潤荷) – U.S. women's chess champion in 2019 and 2022
 Caroline Zhang (张圆圆) – figure skater

Other

Astronauts
 Leroy Chiao – NASA astronaut
 Kjell N. Lindgren – NASA astronaut
 Edward Lu – NASA astronaut
 Taylor Wang – first ethnic Chinese scientist to go into space, in 1985 on space shuttle Challenger

Gang leaders and criminals
 Wing Yeung Chan – leader of New York Ghost Shadows street gang
 Raymond Kwok Chow (周國祥) – also known as "Shrimp Boy", mobster, leader of the San Francisco chapter of Chinese Freemasons and San Francisco Chinatown
 Peter Chong (莊炳強) – leader of San Francisco area Wo Hop To gang
 David Chou (周文偉) – perpetrator of 2022 Laguna Woods church shooting
 Mock Duck (世荣模拟) – New York Chinatown mobster, leader of the Hip Sing Tong
 Johnny "Onionhead" Eng (伍少衡) – leader of New York Flying Dragons street gang
 Joe Fong – founder of San Francisco Chung Ching Yee (Joe Boys) street gang
 Katrina Leung (陈文英) – Double agent for both U.S. and China 
 Wayne Lo (駱文) – murderer who perpetrated the shooting at Simon's Rock College of Bard on December 14, 1992 in Great Barrington, Massachusetts
 Danny Pang – private equity manager, accused of running a Ponzi scheme
 Little Pete (馮正初) – San Francisco Chinatown mobster
 Elliot Rodger – of mixed English and Malaysian Chinese descent who perpetrated the 2014 Isla Vista shootings
 Ming Sen Shiue (薛明升) – committed notorious 1980 murder, rape, stalking
 Stephen Tse – leader of Boston Ping On street gang

Crime victims
 Bow Kum – her murder was the precipitating event for infamous New York Tong war
 Vincent Jen Chin (陳果仁) – beaten to death in 1982 racial hate incident by two White men considered by Chinese-American advocacy groups to be miscarriage of American justice
 Wenjian Liu – first Chinese American officer in the New York City Police Department to die in the line of duty in 2014
 Betty Ong (鄧月薇) – flight attendant on American Airlines Flight 11, alerted ground crews and kept the world informed of the hijacking in progress

Religious leaders
 Francis Chan – preacher, founder of Cornerstone Community Church in Simi Valley, CA
 Chow Leung – Baptist missionary in Chicago, Chinese school founder, co-author of Chinese Fables and Folk Stories
 Gerrit W. Gong – Member of the Quorum of the Twelve Apostles of The Church of Jesus Christ of Latter-day Saints
 Jian Tan (見曇) – Buddhist monk and current abbot of the Chung Tai Zen Center of Houston
 Jakusho Kwong – Zen Buddhist Master of Shunryu Suzuki lineage, founder and head abbot of Sonoma Mountain Zen Center
 Jacqueline Mates-Muchin – world's first Chinese-American rabbi
 Ignatius C. Wang – Auxiliary Bishop of San Francisco (2002–2009)
 Shi Yan Ming (釋延明) – 34th generation Shaolin monk and founder of the USA Shaolin Temple
 Jimmy Yu (Guo Gu or 果谷) – Chan teacher of Sheng Yen lineage, Associate Professor of Religion at Florida State University and founder of Tallahassee Chan Center in Tallahassee, Florida

Other
 Bei Bei Shuai (帅贝贝) – Prosecuted for murder and feticide due to a pregnancy loss after a suicide attempt.

References 

Chinese
Chinese
Americans
Chinese